Rolf Fransson (30 October 1942 – 21 October 2016) was a Swedish footballer. Fransson made 17 Allsvenskan appearances for Djurgården and was part of the 1966 Swedish championship team.

References

Swedish footballers
Allsvenskan players
Djurgårdens IF Fotboll players
Association footballers not categorized by position
1942 births
2016 deaths